Bumper music, or a bump, is a term used in the radio broadcasting industry to refer to short clips of signature songs or theme music used to buffer transitions between programming elements, typically lasting no longer than fifteen seconds. It is also a term for music played at music venues such as concerts before showtime, to fill the air, with a musical atmosphere. Bumper music is commonly employed when a syndicated program takes a break for local station identification or "goes to a radio advertisement". More often than not it is called a "bump" in today's radio; NPR also uses the term "button". It is also referred to as "rejoiner music" when the bumper music marks the end of a local break on a radio network.

See also
Continuity (broadcasting)
Bumper (broadcasting)
Sting (musical phrase)
Theme music
Voice-over

References

Broadcasting